John Hamilton Barnes (14 November 1916 in Armagh, Ireland – 22 April 1943 in Nottinghamshire, England) was an Irish cricketer. He was a right-handed batsman and a right-arm fast bowler who played twice for Ireland against New Zealand in September 1937. The first of those two matches had first-class status.

References
CricketEurope Stats Zone profile
Cricket Archive profile
Cricinfo profile
CWGC entry

1916 births
1943 deaths
Irish cricketers
People from Armagh (city)
Cricketers from Northern Ireland
Royal Air Force Volunteer Reserve personnel of World War II
Royal Air Force personnel killed in World War II
Royal Air Force officers